George F. Nafziger (born 1949) is an American writer and editor of books and articles in military history.

Biography 
He was born in 1949, in Lakewood, Ohio to Betty and George Nafziger.

He worked in a US Department of State program known as ACOTA, where he trained African officers in peacekeeping operations from 2002 to 2012.

List of works

Middle East

Nafziger, George & Walton, Mark, Islam at War (Westport, CT: Praeger, 2003).

Medieval wars

Colonel Hardy de Perini. French Military Campaigns 1214 to 1542. Translated by G. F. Nafziger. (self published)
Commandant de Coynart. The Battle of Dreux, 1562. Translated by G. F. Nafziger. (self published)
Delpech, Henry. The Battle of Muret (1213) and the Cavalry Tactics in the 13th Century. Translated by G. F. Nafziger.
Gigon, S.C., The Third war of Religion: The Battle sof Jarnac and Moncontour (1568-1569) Translated by George Nafziger, (self published 2012)
de la Combe, F., Chalres the Bold: The Siege of Nancy (1476-1477) Translated by George Nafziger, (self published 2013)
de la Barre Duparcq, Cpt. Military History of Prussia From 1325 Through the War of the Austrian Succession Translated by George Nafziger, (self published 2012)
Schlumberger, G., Expedition of the Almugavars or Caalan Routiers in Byzantium (1302-1311) Translated by George Nafziger, (self published 2011)

Wars between 1600 and 1700

Baron von Holtzendorf. War of Bavarian Succession (1778–1779). Translated by G. F. Nafziger.
Sautai, Maurice. The Battle of Malplaquet. Translated by G. F. Nafziger.
Rambaud, A., The Russians and Prussians During the Seven Years War Translated by George Nafziger, (self published 2013)

Dabormida, V., The Battle of Assiette, 1747 Translated by George Nafziger, (self published 2012)
Pichat, H., Maurice de Saxe's 1745 Campaign in Belgium Translated by George Nafziger, (self published 2011)
Rousseau, A., The King of France's 1744-1745 Campaign Translated by George Nafziger, (self published 2012)
St. Simon, Marquis de, History of the War in the Alps, or the Campaign of 1744 Translated by George Nafziger, (self published 2012)
de la Roziere, C., Campaign of the Marechal de Crequy in Lorraine and Alsace in 1667 Translated by George Nafziger, (self published 2012)
de Montholon, Count de, The Wars of Marshal Turenne Translated by George Nafziger, (self published 2011)
Marchal, Cpt., Wars of Louis XIV (1664-1714) Translated by George Nafziger, (self published 2013)
de Merveilleux, D.F., The 1695 Namur Campaign Translated by George Nafziger, (self published 2013)
de la Roziere, C., The 1674 Flanders Campaign of Louis, Prince de Conde (Battle of Seneffe) Translated by George Nafziger, (self published 2013)
d'Aumale, Duke, Conde's First Campaign (Rocroy and Thionville 1643) Translated by George Nafziger, (self published 2013)

The Seven Years War

Moulliard, Lucien. The French Army of Louis XV. Translated by G. F. Nafziger.
Nafziger, George F. The Prussian Army of Friedrich der Grosse. Two volumes.

Napoleonic works
Nafziger, George F., The End Of Empire: Napoleon's 1814 Campaign (Solihull: Helion and Company, 2015)
Nafziger, George F. Imperial Bayonets. (London; Greenhill Books, 2000).
Nafziger, George F. Napoleon's Invasion of Russia.  (Novato, CA: Presidio, 1988).
Nafziger, George F., Napoleon at Leipzig, the Battle of Nations 1813 (Chicago: Emperor's Press, 1996).
Nafziger, George F., Napoleon at Dresden, The Battles of August 1813 (Chicago: Emperor's Press, 1994).
Nafziger, George F., Lutzen and Bautzen, Napoleon's Spring Campaign of 1813 (Chicago: Emperor's Press, 1992).
Nafziger, George F., Historical Dictionary of the Napoleonic Era (Lanham, MD: Scarecrow Press, 2002).
Nafziger, George F., Gioannini, M., The Defense of the Napoleonic Kingdom of Northern Italy, 1813-1814 (West Port, CT: Praeger, 2002).
Anonymous. Operations of the 7th Polish Light Cavalry Division in the Leipzig Campaign. Translated/annotated by G. F. Nafziger.

World War II tactical studies

Nafziger, George German Order of Battle, Panzers and Artillery in WWII (London, UK: Greenhill   Books, 1999).
Nafziger, George German Order of Battle, Infantry in WWII  (London, UK: Greenhill Books, 2000).
Nafziger, George German Order of Battle, Waffen SS and Other Units in WWII (Conshohocken, PA: Combined Books, Inc., 2001).
Nafziger, George Bulgarian Order of Battle, World War II (self published 1995)
Nafziger, George French Order of Battle In World War II, 1939-1945 (self published 1995)
Nafziger, George Rumanian Order of Battle World War II: An Organizational History of the Rumanian Army in World War II (self published 1995)
Nafziger, George Italian Order of Battle World War II (self published 1996) 
Nafziger, George The Growth and Organization of the Chinese Army (1895-1845) (self published 1999)
Nafziger, George American order of battle in WWII (self published 2000) 
The United States Army. American Tank Company Tactics. Edited by G. F. Nafziger.
The United States Army. Employment of Tanks With Infantry. Edited by G. F. Nafziger.

References

External links
A list of books by George Nafziger at Amazon.com
https://nafzigercollection.com/ Official site for the Nafziger Collection
The Nafziger Collection of Napoleonic Orders of Battle

American military historians
American book editors
American military writers
United States Navy officers
Living people
Miami University alumni
Union Institute & University alumni
1949 births
Historians of the Napoleonic Wars
20th-century American historians
20th-century American male writers
21st-century American historians
21st-century American male writers
American male non-fiction writers
People from Lakewood, Ohio
Historians from Ohio